The redside barb or two-spot barb (Puntius bimaculatus) is a species of ray-finned fish in the genus Puntius. It is found in India and Sri Lanka. It was identified and classified by Pieter Bleeker in 1863.

Description 
Puntius bimaculatus is a small fish with a slender, compressed, torpedo-shaped body. The adult size for both the sexes is maximum 7 cm. This species exhibits sexual dimorphism, which allows for easy identification of the sexes. It has two black spots: one at the base of the dorsal fin and one at the junction of body and caudal fin. There is a colored band from its eyes to the spot at the caudal fin. In mature males, the band has a distinct dark red coloration in the middle with a bronze-greenish-colored stripe above the red band. The eyes have a red-colored outer semi-circle. In females, the red is less pronounced and the bronze-colored band will be difficult to distinguish from its body scale color. The females has a slightly plumper body.

Habitat 
This fish lives in hill streams, lowland swamps and dry zone rivers and tanks. They are benthopelagic and feed on green algae and detritus.{2,3}. They live on water with pH range 6.5 - 7.5 and dH 5-15.It is found abundantly in the river bank ,lowland and hilly stream in Tripura caught mostly by the indigenous tribes

In the aquarium 
They are very active, fast swimmers and are very peaceful towards other tank mates. They will be attractive in a school of more than 6. They love moderate currents and swim against it. With a free space to dart around they would appreciate hiding spots between plants, driftwoods and rocks. In a planted tank they use to nibble the green algae from the leaves. They are non fussy eaters and accepts most of the prepared foods. In a school the most dominant male would be showing brilliantly colored red stripe with a greenish bronze colored upper band. It is not known about its breeding in the aquarium. Being of peaceful temperament they are suitable to most of the community aquaria.

Commercial importance 
They are important in the aquarium trade {4}.

References 

2. Pethiyagoda, R. 1991 Freshwater fishes of Sri Lanka. The Wildlife Heritage Trust of Sri Lanka, Colombo. 362 p. (Ref. 6028)
3. Talwar, P.K. and A.G. Jhingran 1991 Inland fishes of India and adjacent countries. vol 1. A.A. Balkema, Rotterdam. 541 p.
4. Arunachalam, M., J.A. Johnson, S.N. Sathyanarayanappa, A. Sankaranarayanan and R. Soranam 2000 Cultivable and ornamental fishes from Hemavathi and Ekachi rivers, South Karnataka. p. 226-227. In A.G. Ponniah and A. Gopalakrishnan (eds.) Endemic fish diversity of Western Ghats. NBFGR-NATP Publication. National Bureau of Fish Genetic Resources, Lucknow, U.P., India. 1,347 p.

bimaculatus
Fish described in 1863
Taxa named by Pieter Bleeker
Barbs (fish)